Dagmar Koller (born 26 August 1939) is an Austrian actress and singer.

Born in Klagenfurt, she is recognized as the leading German language musical star of her time. She married Austrian journalist and politician, Helmut Zilk, in 1978, and became the first lady of Vienna while he served as mayor. During this time she maintained her active career as a musical star, playing the roles of Eliza Doolittle in My Fair Lady and Dulcinea in Man of La Mancha, while also hosting her own television show. As First Lady of Vienna she received such international luminaries as Prince Charles and Diana, Princess of Wales, Frank Sinatra, Liza Minnelli, Plácido Domingo, and American First Lady, Nancy Reagan. She is credited with having saved her husband's life after a letter bomb explosion in their private residence.

External links
 Official site
 
 

1939 births
Austrian film actresses
Austrian voice actresses
20th-century Austrian women singers
Living people
Musicians from Klagenfurt
Austrian television actresses
20th-century Austrian actresses
21st-century Austrian actresses
People of Moravian-German descent
Carniolan people of Czech descent
Actors from Klagenfurt